Hanover Square in downtown Syracuse is actually a triangle at the intersection of Warren, Water, and East Genesee Streets. The name may also refer to the larger Hanover Square Historic District which includes seventeen historic buildings in the area that was the first commercial district in Syracuse.  In the warm weather months, entertainment is common on the plaza around the fountain.  Workers in the surrounding office buildings and retail establishments often lunch there.

History 

When Syracuse was still a village, the village well was located in Hanover Square. Listed on the National Register of Historic Places since 1976, the square is an intact, mainly nineteenth century historic district.  The buildings on Water Street were backed by the Erie Canal, and were known as “double-enders.” This facilitated the unloading of goods from barges on the canal. Civil War recruiting booths were set up in the square, and were made into a huge bonfire at the end of the war.

Hanover Square Historic District contributing Properties 

The 17 properties can be visited in order, starting at South Salina Street and Water Street, going east on Water Street, turning south on Warren Street, and returning on the diagonal along East Genesee Street to Water.

Today 
In addition to modern businesses, eateries and stores, loft-style apartments have been created on the upper floors of some of Hanover Square's historic buildings.

The 23-floor State Tower Building overlooking the square hosts offices and is a major telecommunications hub for downtown Syracuse.

References

External links
Hanover Square, at SyracuseThenAndNow

Historic districts in Onondaga County, New York
Neighborhoods in Syracuse, New York
Parks in Syracuse, New York